is the second studio album by Japanese rock band Maximum the Hormone.

Track listing

Charting positions

Album

Personnel
Daisuke – lead vocals
Maximum the Ryo – guitar, vocals
Ue-chan – bass, backing vocals
Nao – drums, vocals

Notes
"Rolling1000toon" was featured as an ending theme for the anime series Air Master and as a playable song in the Bemani games DrumMania 10th MIX and GuitarFreaks 11th MIX.
Several songs on the album finish with a quacking noise.

References

2005 albums
Maximum the Hormone albums